Česko Slovenská SuperStar: Výběr finálových hitů is the soundtrack album from the second season of the talent contest Česko Slovenská SuperStar, released by Universal. It contains one cover song from each of the top ten finalists of the TV show, and one ensemble track performed by the top twelve contestants.

The compilation was preceded by the single "Nevzdávám", issued through iTunes on April 22, 2011. As such, the track peaked at number twenty-four on the Slovak radio component chart and at number forty-two on the fellow airplay-list in Czech Republic.

Track listing

Credits and personnel

 Lukáš Adamec - lead vocalist, backing vocalist
 Gabriela Gunčíková - lead vocalist, backing vocalist
 Michal Šeps - lead vocalist, backing vocalist
 Martin Harich - lead vocalist, backing vocalist
 Petr Ševčík - lead vocalist, backing vocalist
 Martin Kurc - lead vocalist, backing vocalist
 Alžběta Kolečkářová - lead vocalist, backing vocalist
 Simona Fecková - lead vocalist, backing vocalist
 Matej Piňák - lead vocalist, backing vocalist
 Celeste Buckingham - lead vocalist, backing vocalist

 Monika Povýšilová - lead vocalist, backing vocalist 
 Klaudia Pappová - lead vocalist, backing vocalist
 Tomáš Zubák - writer, producer
 Václav Pokorný - writer, producer
 Peter Graus - writer, producer
 Marián Kachút - writer, producer
 TV Nova - executive producer
 Markíza - executive producer
 Universal - distributor

Charts

Peak positions

Singles

Release history

See also
 Celeste Buckingham discography
 The 100 Greatest Slovak Albums of All Time

References
General

Specific

External links 
 AllMusic.com > Various Artists > Česko Slovenská SuperStar: Výběr finálových hitů
 UMusic.cz > Katalog > Česko Slovenská SuperStar 2011: Výběr finálových hitů

Soundtrack
2011 compilation albums
2011 soundtrack albums